In constitutional law, the presumption of constitutionality is the legal principle that the judiciary should presume statutes enacted by the legislature to be constitutional, unless the law is clearly unconstitutional or a fundamental right is implicated.

United States
In its strongest form—advocated most notably by James Bradley Thayer—the presumption of constitutionality gives Congress, rather than the courts, the primary responsibility for interpreting the Constitution. This view is in tension with the view of judicial review articulated in Marbury v. Madison, however. Thus, a less strong form of the presumption, repeatedly articulated by the Supreme Court of the United States, has become the dominant approach in American law: "[r]espect for a coordinate branch of Government forbids striking down an Act of Congress except upon a clear showing of unconstitutionality." Constitutional law scholars Gillian E. Metzger and Trevor Morrison summarize this principle as follows: "although the Court's determination of constitutional invalidity always trumps the contrary judgment of a coordinate branch, the Court should not lightly arrive at such a determination."

The presumption of constitutionality is linked to the doctrine of constitutional avoidance (the doctrine that courts will not make rulings on constitutional issues if the case can be resolved on a non-constitutional basis) and the rule that courts will not interpret an ambiguous statute to be unconstitutional in the absence of clear unconstitutionality.

The Supreme Court has held that statutes implicating certain fundamental individual rights are not subject to the general presumption, and are evaluated instead through heightened levels of scrutiny. By contrast, economic legislation is subject to the presumption of constitutionality.

In Federalist 78, Alexander Hamilton wrote that courts should be able strike down a statute as unconstitutional only if there is an "irreconcilable variance" between the statute and the constitution.  Otherwise, a statute should be upheld. Likewise, at the 1787 Philadelphia Convention, Virginia delegate George Mason said that judges "could declare an unconstitutional law void. But with regard to every law, however unjust, oppressive or pernicious, which did not come plainly under this description, they would be under the necessity as Judges to give it a free course."

Professor Randy Barnett from Georgetown Law argues that such a presumption is itself unconstitutional and suggests that government should be forced to prove that laws that violate liberty are necessary, replacing the presumption of constitutionality with what he calls the "presumption of liberty."

Outside the United States
The presumption of constitutionality is part of the constitutional law of a number of nations outside the U.S., including the Republic of Ireland and Singapore.

See also
Presumption of regularity
Burden of persuasion
List of legal doctrines
Rational basis review

References

Legal doctrines and principles
Constitutional law